Exoteric refers to knowledge that is outside and independent from a person's experience and can be ascertained by anyone (related to common sense).

The word is derived from the comparative form of Greek ἔξω eksô, "from, out of, outside". It signifies anything which is public, without limits, or universal. It is distinguished from internal esoteric knowledge. "Exoteric" relates to external reality as opposed to a person's thoughts or feelings. It is knowledge that is public as opposed to secret or cabalistic.  It is not required that exoteric knowledge come easily or automatically, but it should be referenceable or reproducible.

Philosophical context 
Most philosophical and religious belief systems presume that reality must be independent of what an individual makes of it. However, even before the days of Plato, a prominent alternate theory of knowledge insisted that the perceived outside reality is merely an internal fabrication of the observer and that it has no existence or substance outside the imagination of the observer. The Buddha's statement: "All that we are arises with our thoughts"  (Dhammapada 1.1) is reminiscent of this.

In his book entitled The Book of Five Rings, the Japanese swordsmaster Miyamoto Musashi noted that when he teaches people martial arts, "since [he] generally makes them learn such things as have actual relevance to addressing [deeper principles], there is no such thing as a distinction between the esoteric and the exoteric."

Religious context 
In the same way as the term "esoteric" is often associated with esoteric spirituality, the term "exoteric" is mostly used in discussions of religion and spirituality, as when the teachings shift the believer's focus away from an exploration of the inner self and towards an adherence to rules, laws, and an individual God.

The term "exoteric" may also reflect the notion of a divine identity that is outside of, and different from, human identity, whereas the esoteric notion claims that the divine is to be discovered within the human identity. Going one step further, the pantheistic notion suggests that the divine and the material world are one and the same.

The Ismaili interpretation of Shia Islam operates in the framework of a co-existence between the exoteric (zahir) form and the esoteric (batin) essence. Without the esoteric, the exoteric is like a mirage or illusion with no place in reality.

Government
The exoteric form of government is one where all actions taken by the government must be both publicly disclosed and ratified by the public. This is often referred to as transparency of governance.

Societies
Many societies are divided into 2 sections—the exoteric or "public face" and the esoteric or "behind closed doors". Such are many fraternal organizations, such as Freemasonry, which are at some level accessible to the uninitiated but which have higher and higher levels of initiation as one progresses.

See also
 Qualia
 Philosophical realism

References

External links
 Esoteric and Exoteric  – An article on the use of these terms in mystic and occult literature

Epistemology
!
Cognition